Johan Olaf Bredal (10 March 1862 – 26 April 1948) was a Norwegian barrister and politician. 

Johan Olaf Bredal was born in Larvik, Norway. From 1886–1887, he was an attorney in Drammen.  He was a prosecutor in Sandefjord 1887-1894 and became a Supreme Court Attorney in 1891. He was the chairman of the Norwegian Law and Counselors Association 1903–1904. He served as Minister of Justice in the short-lived  cabinet  of Jørgen Løvland from October 1907 to March 1908.

References

1862 births
1948 deaths
People from Larvik
Norwegian jurists
Government ministers of Norway
Ministers of Justice of Norway